The 2019 China Open was a tennis tournament being played on outdoor hard courts. It was the 21st edition of the China Open for the men and the 23rd for the women. It was part of the ATP Tour 500 series on the 2019 ATP Tour, and the last WTA Premier Mandatory tournament of the 2019 WTA Tour. Both the men's and the women's events were held at the National Tennis Center in Beijing, China, from September 30 to October 6, 2019. This was also the last edition of the China Open held to date as not being held in 2020 and 2021 due to the COVID-19 pandemic in China.

Points and prize money

Point distribution

Prize money

ATP singles main-draw entrants

Seeds

 1 Rankings are

Other entrants
The following players received wildcards into the singles main draw:
  Li Zhe
  Frances Tiafoe
  Zhang Zhizhen

The following player received an entry using a protected ranking:
  Andy Murray

The following player received entry as a special exempt:
  Albert Ramos Viñolas

The following players received entry from the qualifying draw:
  Jérémy Chardy
  Pablo Cuevas
  Dan Evans
  Cameron Norrie

Withdrawals
  Nick Kyrgios → replaced by  Sam Querrey
  Daniil Medvedev → replaced by  Mikhail Kukushkin

Retirements
  Cristian Garín

ATP doubles main-draw entrants

Seeds

 Rankings are

Other entrants
The following pairs received wildcards into the doubles main draw:
  Gao Xin /  Hua Runhao
  Gong Maoxin /  Zhang Ze

The following pair received entry from the qualifying draw:
  Kyle Edmund /  Dan Evans

WTA singles main-draw entrants

Seeds
The following are the seeded players. Seedings are based on WTA rankings .

† The player did not qualify for the tournament in 2018. Accordingly, points for her 16th best result are deducted instead.

The following players would have been seeded, but withdrew before the event.

Other entrants 
The following players received wildcards into the singles main draw:
  Svetlana Kuznetsova
  Jeļena Ostapenko
  Peng Shuai
  Wang Xinyu
  Wang Xiyu

The following players received entry from the qualifying draw:
  Anna Blinkova
  Jennifer Brady
  Lauren Davis
  Magda Linette
  Christina McHale
  Bernarda Pera
  Rebecca Peterson
  Andrea Petkovic

Withdrawals
Before the tournament
  Victoria Azarenka → replaced by  Jil Teichmann
  Johanna Konta → replaced by  Veronika Kudermetova
  Anett Kontaveit → replaced by  Venus Williams 
  Maria Sakkari → replaced by  Polona Hercog
  Carla Suárez Navarro → replaced by  Ajla Tomljanović
  Lesia Tsurenko → replaced by  Jessica Pegula
  Markéta Vondroušová → replaced by  Wang Yafan
  Serena Williams → replaced by  Kristina Mladenovic

Retirements
  Wang Qiang (cramping)

WTA doubles main-draw entrants

Seeds

1 Rankings are

Other entrants
The following pairs received wildcards into the doubles main draw:
  Sofia Kenin /  Bethanie Mattek-Sands
  Makoto Ninomiya /  Yang Zhaoxuan
  Peng Shuai /  Wang Yafan

Champions

Men's singles

  Dominic Thiem def.  Stefanos Tsitsipas, 3–6, 6–4, 6–1

Women's singles

 Naomi Osaka def.  Ashleigh Barty, 3–6, 6–3, 6–2

Men's doubles

  Ivan Dodig /  Filip Polášek def.  Łukasz Kubot /  Marcelo Melo,  6–3, 7–6(7–4)

Women's doubles

  Sofia Kenin /  Bethanie Mattek-Sands def.  Jeļena Ostapenko /  Dayana Yastremska, 6–3, 6–7(5–7), [10–7]

References

External links
Official Website

 
2019
2019 ATP Tour
2019 WTA Tour
2019 in Chinese tennis
October 2019 sports events in China